Shivaram Wildlife Sanctuary is a wildlife preserve in India located in Mancherial district of Telangana and is located 10 km from Manthani, 40 km from Peddapalli, 80 km from Karimnagar and 30 km from Godavarikhani. It also harbours Indian leopards, sloth bears, nilgai, blackbucks, chitals, pythons, and langurs. The undulating natural terrain adds to the beauty of the sanctuary. It also has bird species like parrots, peacocks, harpy eagles, vultures, and the pretty macaws

References

Wildlife sanctuaries of Telangana
Protected areas with year of establishment missing